Das Rauschen des Meeres is a 2010 short drama film directed by Ana Rocha Fernandes and Torsten Truscheit. It was filmed in 2009. The movie features Tyron Ricketts and Mayra Andrade, known to Capeverdeans as the greatest singer.

Synopsis
A refugee from Africa has been sitting in a detained prison for several days without any papers of his identity. When it is assumed, the detainee could take his life, a guard would be taken care of him. He discovers that refugee with a photo depicting a little girl. As a result, the attendant becomes interested in the prisoner and a friendship develops between the two.

Later, the guard risks his employment to help the prisoner escape from the detained prison so that he can find his daughter, the girl in the photo.

Cast
Tyron Ricketts - prisoner
Sven Pippig - prisoner of war
Ronnie Janot - law enforcement mother
Mayra Andrade - mother
Ralph Martin
Malayka Fernandes - daughter

Production and release
Niama-FIlm GmbH in Stuttgart produced the film in cooperation with Southwest State Radio, ARTE and the Bayerischer Rundfunk.  It was filmed in Stuttgart and Kehl.  It was shown at a German film festival on October 27, 2010. The film later aired on ARTE network on 19 December.

Nomination
In December 11, 2011, two German films Raju, directed by Max Zähle and Das Rauschen des Meeres were submitted to be one of the around a hundred films to be selected as a nomination for Best Live Action Short Film. On January 24, 2012, AMPAS chose to nominate the film Raju as a candidate for an Oscar for Best Live Action Short Film.

References

External links
 

2010 films
German drama short films
2010 drama films
2010 short films